Tipu Sultan's Summer Palace, in Bangalore, India, is an example of Indo-Islamic architecture and was the summer residence of the Mysorean ruler Tipu Sultan. Hyder Ali commenced its construction within the walls of the Bangalore Fort, and it was completed during the reign of Tipu Sultan in 1791. After Tipu Sultan's death in the Fourth Anglo-Mysore War, the British Administration used the palace for its secretariat before moving to Attara Kacheri in 1868. Today the Archaeological Survey of India maintains the palace, which is located at the center of Old Bangalore near the Kalasipalya bus stand, as a tourist spot.

The structure was built entirely teak and stands adorned with pillars, arches and balconies. It is believed that Tipu Sultan used to conduct his durbar (court) from the eastern and western balconies of the upper floor. There are four smaller rooms in the corners of first floor which were Zenana Quarters. There are beautiful floral motifs embellishing the walls of the palace. The site also holds a painting of grand throne visualized by Tipu Sultan himself. Coated with gold sheets and stuck with precious emerald stones, Tipu had vowed never to use it until he completely defeated the British Army. After Tipu Sultan's death, the British dismantled the throne and auctioned its parts as it was too expensive for a single person to buy whole.

The rooms in the ground floor have been converted into a small museum showcasing various achievements of Tipu Sultan and his administration. There are newly done portraits of the people and places of that time. There is a replica of Tipu's Tiger, which is in the Victoria and Albert Museum in London. Tipu Sultan's clothes and his crown are present in silver and gold pedestals. The silver vessels given by a general to Hyder Ali is also displayed.

The Horticulture Department, Government of Karnataka, maintains the area in front of the palace as a garden and lawn

Vintage Gallery

Sketches of James Hunter 

James Hunter served as a lieutenant in the Artillery. He was a military painter, and his sketches portrayed aspects and everyday life. Hunter served the British India Army and took part in Tippu Sultan Campaigns.

Hunter has sketched different landscapes of South India, including Bangalore, Mysore, Hosur, Kancheepuram, Madras, Arcot, Sriperumbudur, etc. These paintings were published in 'A Brief history of ancient and modern India embellished with coloured engravings', published by Edward Orme, London between 1802 and 1805, and 'Picturesque scenery in the Kingdom of Mysore' published by Edward Orme in 1804.

Hunter died in India in 1792. Some of his paintings of Bangalore Palace are below

Inscriptions 

(2)Zar – A system invented by Tipu Sultan, calculating by abtas instead of the ordinary abjad, the Arab notation in common use among Muhammadans. (See Mysore Gazetteer, revised edition of 1897, Vol. I, Appendix, p. 812)

(3)A prophet who was minister to a king of Persia. He discovered and drank of the fountain of life and became immortal. By some he is confused with the prophet Elias, and likewise with St. George of England, whom they call Khizir Elias.

Gallery

References 

Buildings and structures in Bangalore Urban district
Tourist attractions in Bangalore Urban district
Tourist attractions in Bangalore
Palaces in Bangalore
Tipu Sultan
Government buildings completed in 1791
1791 establishments in India
Houses completed in 1791